Vedita Pratap Singh (born 9 October 1987) is an Indian model and actor. Her first film was Bhindi Bazaar

Career
Singh starred in a touring production of Kadar Khan's play Taash Ki Patti, which was taken around India and also presented in Dubai. She won a national swimming scholarship from the Sports Authority of India and also took part in various theatre productions. Singh won the Channel V India television show India's Hottest in its 2008-09 season . Vedita was the female lead in Hemant Madhukar's Mumbai 125 KM after Bhindi Bazaar Inc. Vedita also as a cop in SuperCops vs. Supervillains. She plays a journalist in JD, the directorial debut Hindi feature film of photojournalist Shailendra Pandey. This film was inspired by Indian print media.

Vedita's most recent film, The Hidden Strike, is based on the Uri assaults and was published on an OTT platform on the eve of Independence Day 2020. In the film, she plays the role of an Indian Army officer.

The actor is also heavily interested in promoting animal welfare topics.

Personal life
In January 2021, Singh married Aaron Edward Sale at the Lake County Court in Montana, United States.

Filmography 
All films are in Hindi, unless otherwise noted

References

External links
 
 

Indian film actresses
Actresses in Hindi cinema
Living people
Female models from Uttar Pradesh
21st-century Indian actresses
Actresses from Allahabad
Mayo College Girls School alumni
Indian stage actresses
1987 births